Bram Moolenaar (born 1961 in Lisse) is a Dutch computer programmer and an active member of the open-source software community. He is the original author, maintainer, release manager, and benevolent dictator for life of Vim, a vi-derivative text editor that is very popular among programmers and power users. From July 2006 until September 2021 Moolenaar was employed by Google working in the Zürich office. He was able to spend part of his time maintaining Vim.

Charity work and awards 

Moolenaar is an advocate of the ICCF charity, encouraging people to support orphans in Uganda. He pioneered a methodology called charityware through Vim. The software itself is available for free, but it encourages the user to donate to the programmer's favorite charity. A number of other applications have been licensed this way since the inception of this concept. The opening "splash" screen for Vim encourages support of ICCF.

Moolenaar has been a member of the Dutch Unix user group, NLUUG, which presented him with an award during its 25th anniversary, for his creation of Vim and his contributions to open source software in general.

Vim 

The Vim editor started as "Vi IMitation" on the Amiga in 1988, but was later relabeled "Vi IMproved" and ported to many other platforms. As vi was a popular editor amongst programmers and system administrators, initially there was doubt whether Bram's 'improved' version could achieve the quality and fan following of the original. But since its first release for Unix systems in 1992, Vim has effectively eclipsed the original Vi, having won several awards and has been referred to as one of the most popular text editors.

Other software 

Other software tools that Moolenaar has developed include a software build tool written in Python, called A-A-P, which is similar to make, and a programming language called Zimbu which puts an emphasis on readability of programs. Amongst all of Moolenaar's contributions to the field of computer science, the Vim editor remains his most prominent and widely used application.

References

External links
 

1961 births
Living people
Dutch computer programmers
Free software programmers
Google employees
Vi
Delft University of Technology alumni
People from Lisse